Dominic Roque Janes Centorbi (born February 11, 1994) is an American former child actor.

Born in Tucson, Arizona, Janes has had recurring roles in ER, as Alex Taggart, the son of Linda Cardellini's character R.N. Samantha Taggart, and in Dexter, as the younger version of the title character. He also appeared in Crossing Jordan. He starred in the Cartoon Network original film Re-Animated and its spin-off series Out of Jimmy's Head. He also portrayed Billy Madsen in the 2007 movie Wild Hogs. He voiced Squidboy in television series Wolverine and the X-Men.

Janes has performed improvisation comedy at the L.A. Connection in Sherman Oaks, California. His mother is an attorney, his father is a poet, and he has a brother named Ian. His uncle is bassist Joe Preston.

Filmography

External links
 
 Dominic Janes at Teen Stars Online

1994 births
Living people
American male child actors
American male television actors
American male voice actors
Male actors from Tucson, Arizona